Jacob Brennan (born 24 January 1990) is an Australian rules footballer who previously played for the West Coast Eagles in the Australian Football League (AFL). The son of Michael Brennan, Brennan was drafted at the 2010 National draft, under the father–son rule. He made his debut for the club during the 2012 season, and played 28 games before being delisted at the end of the 2014 season.

Football career
The son of Michael Brennan, who played 179 games for West Coast between 1987 and 1995, Brennan played for East Fremantle in the West Australian Football League (WAFL) before being drafted under the father–son rule with West Coast's fourth-round selection, pick number 62 overall, in the 2010 National draft. Playing mainly as a defender, Brennan was a mature-age recruit, and made his debut against  in round five of the 2012 season.

Brennan was the first son of a West Coast Eagles player to also be listed at the club. His cousin, Fraser McInnes, is currently listed at the club.

Brennan was delisted by West Coast at the end of the 2014 season. He had played at AFL level only twice during the season.

See also
 List of AFL debuts in 2012
 List of West Coast Eagles players

References

External links
 West Coast Eagles player profile
 

1990 births
East Fremantle Football Club players
East Perth Football Club players
Living people
Australian rules footballers from Perth, Western Australia
West Coast Eagles players